Stefan Nikolic (born August 13, 1987) is a Serbian professional basketball player for CSM Târgu Jiu of the Liga Națională. He usually plays the point guard position.

Awards and accomplishments
Greek 2nd Division champion (2014)
Bulgarian League champion (2004)
Bulgarian Cup champion (2004)

Personal life 
He is a son of a Serbian basketball coach and former player Slobodan Nikolić.

References

External links
 DraftExpress: Stefan Nikolic
 basketball-players.org - Nikolic Stefan
 Stefan Nikolic
 Stefan Nikolic at eurobasket.com

1987 births
Living people
AEK B.C. players
CS Energia Rovinari players
CSM Oradea (basketball) players
Greek Basket League players
Gymnastikos S. Larissas B.C. players
Köln 99ers players
KK Ergonom players
KK Lavovi 063 players
OKK Beograd players
PBC Academic players
KK Bratunac players
Point guards
Serbian expatriate basketball people in Bosnia and Herzegovina
Serbian expatriate basketball people in Bulgaria
Serbian expatriate basketball people in Germany
Serbian expatriate basketball people in Greece
Serbian expatriate basketball people in France
Serbian expatriate basketball people in Latvia
Serbian expatriate basketball people in North Macedonia
Serbian expatriate basketball people in Romania
Serbian expatriate basketball people in Russia
Serbian expatriate basketball people in Slovenia
Serbian men's basketball players